The Norwegian School of Sport Sciences (NIH) is a public university located at Sognsvann in Oslo, Norway. It has the national responsibility for education and research related within sport sciences. It provides education at the Bachelor, Master and Doctorate levels.

History
In 1870 the government established The Gymnastical Central School for Athletics and Weapon Use. It changed its name to The State Gymnastics School in 1915. On 1 June 1968 it got its present name and was granted university status. The first Master student was educated in 1973 and the first PhD awarded in 1990.

External links

 
Universities and colleges in Norway
Education in Oslo
Educational institutions established in 1870
Sports universities and colleges
1870 establishments in Norway